Katia Colturi (born 17 October 1971) is an Italian short track speed skater. She competed at the 1994 Winter Olympics and the 1998 Winter Olympics.

References

External links
 

1971 births
Living people
Italian female short track speed skaters
Olympic short track speed skaters of Italy
Short track speed skaters at the 1994 Winter Olympics
Short track speed skaters at the 1998 Winter Olympics
Sportspeople from the Province of Sondrio